The African Youth Championship 1983 was contested through home and away matches. It also served as qualification for the 1983 FIFA World Youth Championship.

Teams
The following teams entered the tournament (and played at least one match):

Preliminary round

|}

1 Liberia were ejected from the competition for using ineligible players in both legs.

2 Senegal withdrew after the first leg.

3 Ethiopia, Ghana, Central African Republic, Mauritius, Congo, Upper Volta and Libya all withdrew.

First round

|}

1 Swaziland withdrew after the first leg.

2 The second leg was scratched and Ivory Coast advanced to the second round after Equatorial Guinea were ejected from the competition for using five ineligible players in the first leg.

Quarterfinals

|}

Semi-finals

|}

Final

|}

Qualification to World Youth Championship
The two best performing teams qualified for the 1983 FIFA World Youth Championship.

External links
Results by RSSSF

Africa U-20 Cup of Nations
Youth
1983 in youth association football